The Hipódromo de Monterrico is a Thoroughbred horse racing facility opened in 1960 in Lima, Peru. Operated by the Jockey Club del Peru,  it has a one and one-eight mile dirt racetrack with a one-mile inside track for turf racing.

Major races at Hipódromo de Monterrico include the four Group One races that comprise the Peruvian Quadruple Crown:
1.a) :es:Polla de Potrillos (Perú) - September, 1,600 metres
1.b) :es:Polla de potrancas - September, 1,600 metres
2.a)Clasico Ricardo Ortiz de Zevallos - October,  2000 metres
2.b) Clasico Enrique Ayulo Pardo - October, 2000 metres
3) Derby Nacional - November, 2400 metres
4) Gran Premio Nacional Augusto B. Leguia - February, 2600 metres

References
 Hipódromo de Monterrico official website (Spanish language)

Horse racing venues in Peru
Sports venues in Lima